GLAMunition is the third album by the Norwegian modern musician Åge Sten Nilsen. It is his first album in nine years to feature all-new material and his first to spawn a physical single. The album was released under his birth name Åge Sten Nilsen, but the album title GLAMunition features GLAM in it, which is his stagename when he's playing with his glam metal band Wig Wam. On June 27 the album and Wolf & Butterfly was released in Japan through King Records.

Track listing

References

2006 albums